The Homeric Hymns are a collection of thirty-three anonymous ancient Greek hymns celebrating individual gods. The hymns are "Homeric" in the sense that they employ the same epic meter—dactylic hexameter—as the Iliad and Odyssey, use many similar formulas and are couched in the same dialect. While the modern scholarly consensus is that they were not written during the lifetime of Homer himself, they were uncritically attributed to him in antiquity—from the earliest written reference to them, Thucydides (iii.104)—and the label has stuck. "The whole collection, as a collection, is Homeric in the only useful sense that can be put upon the word," A. W. Verrall noted in 1894, "that is to say, it has come down labeled as 'Homer' from the earliest times of Greek book-literature."

History
The oldest of the hymns were probably written in the seventh century BC, somewhat later than Hesiod and the usually accepted date for the writing down of the Homeric epics. This still places the older Homeric Hymns among the oldest monuments of Greek literature; but although most of them were composed in the seventh and sixth centuries, a few may be Hellenistic, and the Hymn to Ares might be a late pagan work, inserted when it was observed that a hymn to Ares was lacking. The hymns to Helios and Selene are also thought to have been composed a bit later than the others, but earlier than the one to Ares. Walter Burkert has suggested that the Hymn to Apollo, attributed by an ancient source to Cynaethus of Chios (a member of the Homeridae), was composed in 522 BC for performance at the unusual double festival held by Polycrates of Samos to honor Apollo of Delos and of Delphi.

The hymns, which must be the remains of a once more strongly represented genre, vary widely in length, some being as brief as three or four lines, while others are in excess of five hundred lines. The long ones comprise an invocation, praise, and narrative, sometimes quite extended. In the briefest ones, the narrative element is lacking. The longer ones show signs of having been assembled from pre-existing disparate materials.

Most surviving Byzantine manuscripts begin with the third Hymn. A chance discovery in Moscow in 1777 recovered the two hymns that open the collection, the fragmentary To Dionysus and To Demeter (complete save some lacunose lines), in a single fifteenth-century manuscript. At least some of the shorter ones may be excerpts that have omitted the narrative central section, preserving only the useful invocation and introduction, which a rhapsode could employ in the manner of a prelude.

The thirty-three hymns praise most of the major gods of Greek religion; at least the shorter ones may have served as preludes to the recitation of epic verse at festivals by professional rhapsodes: often the singer concludes by saying that now he will pass to another song. A thirty-fourth, To Hosts is not a hymn, but a reminder that hospitality is a sacred duty enjoined by the gods, a pointed reminder when coming from a professional rhapsode.

List of the Homeric Hymns

 "To Dionysus", 21 lines
 "To Demeter", 495 lines
 "To Apollo", 546 lines 
 "To Hermes", 580 lines
 "To Aphrodite", 293 lines
 "To Aphrodite", 21 lines
 "To Dionysus", 59 lines
 "To Ares", 17 lines 
 "To Artemis", 9 lines
 "To Aphrodite", 6 lines
 "To Athena", 5 lines
 "To Hera", 5 lines
 "To Demeter", 3 lines
 "To the mother of the gods" (Rhea/Cybele), 6 lines
 "To Heracles with the heart of a lion", 9 lines
 "To Asclepius", 5 lines
 "To the Dioscuri", 5 lines
 "To Hermes", 12 lines
 "To Pan", 49 lines
 "To Hephaestus", 8 lines
 "To Apollo", 5 lines
 "To Poseidon", 7 lines
 "To Zeus", 4 lines
 "To Hestia", 5 lines
 "To the Muses and Apollo", 7 lines
 "To Dionysus", 13 lines
 "To Artemis", 22 lines
 "To Athena", 18 lines
 "To Hestia", 13 lines
 "To Gaia, mother of all", 19 lines
 "To Helios", 19 lines
 "To Selene", 20 lines
 "To the Dioscuri", 19 lines

Notes

Select translations
The Homeric Hymns, Apostolos N. Athanassakis (translation, introduction and notes) Baltimore, MD; Johns Hopkins University Press, 1976. (Updated in 2004.)  
The Homeric Hymns: A Translation, with Introduction and Notes, Diane Rayor (2004, updated 2014). This translation sets the hymns in their context of Greek folklore, culture and geography, and offers parallels with Near Eastern texts.
Homeric Hymns, Sarah Ruden, trans. (Indianapolis: Hackett, 2005)
The Homeric Hymns, Works of Hesiod and the Homeric Hymns, Daryl Hine, trans. (Chicago: University of Chicago Press, 2008)
 To Demeter (Εἲς Δημήτραν):
 Gregory Nagy 
 Hugh Gerard Evelyn-White, Perseus Digital Library
 Greek text

Further reading
 Allen, Thomas W., William R. Halliday, and Edward E. Sikes, eds. 1936. The Homeric Hymns. 2d ed. Oxford: Clarendon.
 Clay, Jenny Strauss. 2006. The Politics of Olympus: Form and Meaning in the Major Homeric Hymns. London: Duckworth.
 De Jong, Irene J. F. 2012. "The Homeric Hymns." In Space in Ancient Greek Literature: Studies in Ancient Greek Narrative. Edited by Irene J. F. De Jong, 39-53 Leiden; Boston: Brill.
 Depew, Mary. 2001. "Enacted and Represented Dedications: Genre and Greek Hymn." In Matrices of Genre: Authors, Canons, and Society. Edited by Mary Depew and Dirk Obbink, 59–79. 
 Faulkner, Andrew. 2011. "Modern Scholarship on the Homeric Hymns: Foundational Issues." In The Homeric Hymns: Interpretative Essays. Edited by Andrew Faulkner. 1–25. Oxford, UK: Oxford University Press.
 García, J. 2002. "Symbolic Action in the Homeric Hymns: The Theme of Recognition." Classical Antiquity 21.1: 5-39. 
 Hoekstra, Arie. 1969. The Sub-Epic Stage of the Formulaic Tradition: Studies in the Homeric Hymns to Apollo, to Aphrodite and to Demeter. Amsterdam: Hakkert.
 Janko, Richard. 1981. "The Structure of the Homeric Hymns: A Study in Genre." Hermes 109:9–24.
 Nagy, Gregory. 2009. "Perfecting the Hymn in the Homeric Hymn to Apollo." In Apolline Politics and Poetics. Edited by Lucia Athanassaki, 17–42. Athens: Hellenic Ministry of Culture: European Cultural Centre of Delphi.
 Richardson, Nicholas, ed. 2010. Three Homeric hymns: To Apollo, Hermes, and Aphrodite. Cambridge, UK: Cambridge Univ. Press.
 Sowa, Cora A. 1984. Traditional Themes and the Homeric Hymns. Chicago: Blochazy-Carducci.
 Webster, T. B. L. 1975. "Homeric Hymns and Society." In Le Monde Grec. Pensée, Littérature, Histoire, Documents. Hommages à Claire Préaux. Edited by Jean Bingen, 86–93. Bruxelles: Éditions de l'Université de Bruxelles

External links

Homeric Hymns at Perseus Digital Library
Scholarly bibliography on the Homeric Hymns
Introduction to the Homeric Hymns A condensed version of the introduction by Diane J. Rayor, The Homeric Hymns : A Translation, with Introduction and Notes (2004)

7th-century BC books
6th-century BC books
Ancient Greek hymns
Homer